All About Love (original title: De l'amour) is a 2001 French drama film directed by Jean-François Richet. It stars Virginie Ledoyen and Yazid Aït. It was nominated for an award at the 2001 Cairo International Film Festival in 1945.

Cast
Virginie Ledoyen as Maria
Yazid Aït as Karim
Mar Sodupe as Linda
Stomy Bugsy as Manu
Jean-François Stévenin as Bertrand, the cop

References

External links

2001 films
Films directed by Jean-François Richet
2001 drama films
French drama films
2000s French-language films
2000s French films